Manitoba Agriculture—officially the Department of Agriculture and Resource Development (ARD)—is the department of the Government of Manitoba responsible for the agriculture and natural resources sectors in Manitoba, including agrifood, agriproduct, and food safety, as well as animal health and welfare.

The department was formerly called Manitoba Agriculture, Food and Rural Initiatives. It is overseen by the Minister of Agriculture, who is currently Derek Johnson.

Branches and child organizations 
The Animal Health and Welfare branch, headed by the Chief Veterinary Officer (CVO), is responsible for animal health, welfare, and protection in Manitoba. The current CVO of Manitoba is Dr. Scott Zaari.

The CVO regulates the following legislation:

 The Animal Care Act
 The Animal Diseases Act
 The Dairy Act
 The Livestock Industry Diversification Act
 The Livestock and Livestock Products Act

Agencies and boards 
Agencies and boards under Manitoba Agriculture include the following:

 Agricultural Services Corporation — "encourages the sustainability, development and diversification of agriculture and the rural economy of Manitoba."
 Manitoba Agriculture Research and Innovation Committee (MARIC) — "helps direct research that accelerates the Agri-Food sector’s contribution to economic growth."
 Animal Care Appeal Board — independent appeal body that holds and adjudicates hearings regarding "animal seizures, orders and adverse licensing decisions."
 Appeal Tribunal — body that hears and determines appeals under section 44 of The Manitoba Agricultural Services Corporation Act and section 7.6 of The Crown Lands Act.
 Manitoba Association of Agricultural Societies (MAAS) — organization representing agricultural societies in Manitoba. The Board is composed of civil servants and representatives of non-governmental organizations.
 Beverly Qamanirjuaq Caribou Management Board (BQCMB) — coordinates the management of the Beverly and Qamanirjuaq barren-ground caribou herds, as per the Beverly and Qamanirjuaq Barren Ground Caribou Management Agreement signed by the governments of Canada, Manitoba, Saskatchewan, the Northwest Territories, and Nunavut.
 Conservation Agreements Board 
 Manitoba Farm Industry Board
 Farm Management Canada (FMC)
 Manitoba Farm Products Marketing Council
 Fish and Wildlife Enhancement Fund
 Surface Rights Board — a quasi-judicial board that administers and enforces the Surface Rights Act by resolving land-access and development disputes between "oil and gas development proponents and surface rights holders."
 Manitoba Veterinary Medical Association Council (MVMA) — passes by-laws that govern the practice of veterinary medicine in Manitoba.
 Veterinary Services Commission
 Manitoba Women’s Institute (MWI) — an organization purposed towards improving "the lives of rural women by supporting them through personal development, building leadership skills, family, agriculture, rural development, and community action." It is a member of the Associated Country Women of the World (ACWW) and the Federated Women's Institute of Canada (FWIC/WI Canada).

Agricultural Services Corporation 

The Manitoba Agricultural Services Corporation (MASC) is a Crown corporation of the Manitoba government under the agriculture ministry created to provide land-based products and services that support the growth of agriculture in Manitoba.

It was established in 2005 by The Manitoba Agricultural Services Corporation Act, amalgamated the Manitoba Agricultural Credit Corporation (MACC) and the Manitoba Crop Insurance Corporation (MCIC).

Farm Industry Board 

Acts administered

Provincial legislation 
 The Agricultural Producers' Organization Funding Act
 The Agri-Food and Rural Development Council Act
 The Manitoba Agricultural Services Corporation Act
 The Agricultural Societies Act
 The Department of Agriculture, Food and Rural Initiatives Act
 The Agrologists Act
 The Animal Care Act
 The Animal Diseases Act
 The Animal Liability Act
 The Bee Act
 The Cattle Producers' Act
 The Coarse Grain Marketing Control Act
 The Community Development Bonds Act
 The Cooperative Promotion Trust Act
 The Crown Lands Act — enables the administration of agricultural Crown lands.
 The Dairy Act — enabling legislation for dairy farm and dairy processors to produce dairy products within the province.
 The Family Farm Protection Act
 The Farm Income Assurance Plans Act
 to limit speculation and support the development of strong rural communities.
 The Farm Machinery and Equipment Act
 The Farm Practices Protection Act
 The Farm Products Marketing Act
 The Fruit and Vegetables Sales Act
 The Horse Racing Commission Act
 The Land Rehabilitation Act
 The Livestock and Livestock Products Act — enabling legislation for animal operation within Manitoba.
 The Livestock Industry Diversification Act — the statute regarding animal protection in game animal production within Manitoba
 The Milk Prices Review Act
 The Noxious Weed Act
 The Pesticides and Fertilizers Control Act
 The Planning Act — legislation setting out roles and responsibilities for local governments as they develop land-use plans and zoning bylaws.
 The Plant Pests and Disease Act
 The Public Health Act — enabling legislation for food and food-handling establishments including abattoirs.
 The Seed and Fodder Relief Act
 The Veterinary Medical Act
 The Veterinary Science Scholarship Fund Act
 The Veterinary Services Act
 The Wildlife Act
 The Women's Institute Act

Federal legislation 
 Food and Drugs Act — legislation concerned with health, safety, and economic fraud regarding food, drugs, cosmetics, and medical devices.
 Safe Food for Canadians Act — legislation establishing food safety and traceability requirements for "all food that is destined for interprovincial trade, exported or imported to Canada."

See also

 Manitoba Agricultural Museum

References

Manitoba government departments and agencies
Manitoba
Agriculture in Manitoba
Rural development in North America
Animal welfare organizations based in Canada